Events from the year 1454 in France

Incumbents
 Monarch – Charles VII

Events
 17 February – The Feast of the Pheasant takes place in Lille

Births

Deaths
 Unknown - Jean d'Arces, cardinal

References

1450s in France